DeHeng Law Offices is a Beijing-based Chinese law firm ranked the third largest among domestic firms by number of lawyers. The firm is a private partnership but traces its origins as an offshoot of the China Law Office, a state-owned law office established in 1993.

History
The firm traces back to January 1993 when the Ministry of Justice launched the China Law Office. Big changes had been brewing in the country's legal service market when the firm was founded. Until 1992, all law firms had been state owned.

Naming dispute
A branch in Qingdao was opened in December 1993 called China Law Office Qingdao DeHeng Law Firm.  The branch parted ways with China Law Office in 1995 and went by the name Deheng Law Firm.  The Beijing-based head office also changed its name in 1995, becoming DeHeng Law Offices.  The similar names caused confusion and led to a long running dispute.  While the former Qingdao branch on separating changed one of the Chinese characters in its former parent's name to distinguish itself, the pinyin transliteration of the changed character is still "heng".  The resulting name was different when written in Chinese characters but still identical when rendered in pinyin and sounding similar in spoken Chinese to the name of DeHeng Law Offices.  As of 2017 the former Qingdao branch brands itself as Beijing DHH Law Firm rather than Deheng Law Firm.

Trial of the century
Criminal defense lawyers of DeHeng played a key role in the 2013 trial of Bo Xilai, a former paramount leader within the Communist Party, who was tried for bribery, embezzlement and abuse of power in what was dubbed the trial of the century. DeHeng served as defense counsel with Li Guifang, a partner of the firm, appointed as chief defense attorney. The Wall Street Journal described DeHeng's role as acting as an "intermediary" that facilitated between Mr. Bo, his relatives and prosecutors the negotiation of "an outcome acceptable to all sides in the run-up to the trial—and to help ensure that the trial itself goes according to plan".

Global growth
The firm has considered a "tie-up" with an international law firm. David Chen, a managing partner of the firm and head of cross border transactions, in an interview with legal trade publication Legal Week in February 2015, suggested the firm was considering options for a merger to support outbound investments and mergers. The Chinese legal market had at the time witnessed two mergers between domestic firms and foreign firms with the merger of King & Wood and Mallesons Stephen Jaques to form King & Wood Mallesons in 2012 and the combination of Dacheng Law Offices and Dentons in early 2015.

Practice areas
DeHeng is primarily a corporate law firm advising in Capital Markets, Corporate/M&A, and Banking & Finance, three corporate practice areas where it receives recognition from Chambers Asia-Pacific 2018, a legal directory ranking law firms by practice areas in jurisdictions. The firm is described in its entry in Chambers Asia-Pacific 2018 for Corporate/M&A as having "a distinguished track record in outbound transactions" particularly in the sectors of tech and mining. In capital markets, DeHeng acted for Agricultural Bank of China in its $22.1 billion IPO in 2010, which was then the largest IPO in history.

The full list of practice areas listed on its website are Corporate & Securities, Financing & Insurance, Merger & Acquisition, Venture Capital & Private Equity, International Trade, Foreign Direct Investment, Construction & Real Estate, Dispute Resolution, Labor & Social Security, Intellectual Property Law, Taxation, and Bankruptcy & Restructuring.

Offices
There are 27 domestic offices including the head office in Beijing and four international offices.

 Domestic (27): Beijing, Shenzhen, Guangzhou, Shanghai, Hangzhou, Zhuhai, Suzhou, Tianjin, Wuhan, Changsha, Jinan, Shenyang, Dalian, Changchun, Xian, Chongqing, Zhengzhou, Fuzhou, Urumqi, Nanjing, Taiyuan, Hefei, Chengdu, Kunming, Dongguan, Wenzhou, and Wuxi
 Overseas (5):  Nur-Sultan,  Paris,  Brussels,  Dubai, and  New York City

See also
List of largest Chinese law firms

References

External links
DeHeng Law Offices website 

Law firms of China
Companies based in Beijing
Law firms established in 1993
Chinese companies established in 1993